Patrick Joseph Halliden was an Irish Clann na Talmhan politician. A farmer and teacher by profession, he was first elected to Dáil Éireann as an Clann na Talmhan Teachta Dála (TD) for the Cork North constituency at the 1943 general election. He was re-elected at the 1944 and 1948 general elections. He did not contest the 1951 general election.

References

Year of birth missing
Year of death missing
Clann na Talmhan TDs
Members of the 11th Dáil
Members of the 12th Dáil
Members of the 13th Dáil
Politicians from County Cork
Irish farmers
Irish schoolteachers